Qaleh Sefid-e Olya (also Romanized as Qal‘eh Sefīd-e ‘Olyā; also known as Qal‘eh Sefīd, Qal‘eh-ye Safīd, and Qal‘eh-ye Sefīd) is a village in Margha Rural District, in the Central District of Izeh County, Khuzestan Province, Iran. In the 2006 census, its population was 68 persons, in 15 families.

References 

Populated places in Izeh County